Gerrit Ybema (29 October 1945 – 15 February 2012) was a Dutch politician in the Democrats 66 (D66) party. He served as a Member of the House of Representatives from 14 September 1989 to 3 August 1998, when he became State Secretary for Economic Affairs in the Second Kok cabinet, serving until 22 July 2002.

Born in Schettens, Ybema studied economics at University of Groningen. He graduated cum laude in 1977. After working at Enschede municipality, he moved to Friesland province in 1986 to become advisor to its Gedeputeerde Staten.

He was member of political party Democraten 66 and was elected to the municipal council of Leeuwarden. In 1989 he was elected to the House of Representatives. 
In his latter years, Ybema owned a consultancy company named Ybema Economy Solutions.

Personal life
Ybema was married and lived in the Frisian village Uitwellingerga. He had three children with his first wife. His second wife had two children out of her first marriage.

Decorations
 Order of Oranje-Nassau
 Knight (December 10, 2002)

Notes

References
 Parlement.com biography

1945 births
2012 deaths
Deaths from cancer in the Netherlands
Deaths from lung cancer
Democrats 66 politicians
Dutch businesspeople
Dutch civil servants
Dutch management consultants
Knights of the Order of Orange-Nassau
Members of the House of Representatives (Netherlands)
Municipal councillors of Leeuwarden
People from Wûnseradiel
Protestant Church Christians from the Netherlands
State Secretaries for Economic Affairs of the Netherlands
University of Groningen alumni